Guilherme Lopes da Silva (born 23 August 1992), known as Guilherme Lopes or simply Guilherme, is a Brazilian footballer who plays as an attacking midfielder.

Club career
Born in São Paulo, Guilherme Lopes was a Grêmio Osasco youth graduate, and made his senior debut for the club on 1 August 2012 by starting in a 2–3 home loss against Palmeiras for the year's Copa Paulista. On 31 January of the following year he moved abroad, signing a six-month loan deal with F.C. Porto and being assigned to the reserves in Liga de Honra.

Guilherme Lopes made his professional debut on 7 April 2013, coming on as a late substitute for Tozé in a 2–0 home win against F.C. Arouca; it was his only appearance for the club before his loan expired. He subsequently served another temporary stint at Audax Rio de Janeiro before being released.

On 6 November 2015 Guilherme Lopes signed for Independente de Limeira, after previously representing Nova Iguaçu. In June of the following year, he moved to Série C club Portuguesa.

References

External links

1992 births
Living people
Footballers from São Paulo
Brazilian footballers
Association football midfielders
Nova Iguaçu Futebol Clube players
Associação Portuguesa de Desportos players
Liga Portugal 2 players
FC Porto B players
Brazilian expatriate footballers
Brazilian expatriate sportspeople in Portugal
Expatriate footballers in Portugal